Józef Słonecki (11 August 1899 – 1 October 1970) was a Polish footballer. He played in six matches for the Poland national football team from 1923 to 1925.

References

External links
 

1899 births
1970 deaths
Polish footballers
Poland international footballers
Place of birth missing
Association football forwards